Altos Hornos de Mexico, S.A.B. de C.V. (AHMSA) is the largest integrated steel plant in Mexico. It has corporate offices in Monclova, Coahuila, in the center of the Mexican state of Coahuila, 155 miles from the United States border.

History
Teódulo Flores Calderon donated the land to AHMSA, later Harold Rudolph Pape founded Altos Hornos de Mexico in 1942 in Monclova, Coahuila for its proximity to the border, with the mines of iron located in the same state and Chihuahua, as well as with coal, located in the carboniferous region of Coahuila.

Between 1944 and 1948, the production increased from 40,000 to 100,000 tons of liquid steel per year. In 1960, the smelter increased its capacity to 2 million tons of liquid steel per year, with this being consolidated as the largest company industry in Latin America. Throughout the decade of the '70s and after several expansions, the company achieved production of 3.75 million tons per year.

In the decade of the '80s, AHMSA was nationalized by the federal government and went through several crises. In 1991, AHMSA was privatized and acquired by GAN (North Steeler Group).

In 2005, the company began an upturn in production.

Alonso Ancira, the owner and president of Altos Hornos, was arrested by the Interpol in connection with the 2014 sale of a fertilizer plant to PEMEX, the Mexican-state oil company, on May 28, 2019. The bank accounts of Altos Hornos and Emilio Lozoya Austin, the former CEO of PEMEX, were frozen 24 hours earlier. According to bank records he is bankrupted and has billions in debt. Alonso Ancira and other family members have been charged for corruption, money laundering, fraud and other crimes. It is believed that Lozoya will soon be arrested.

Activity 
Ahmsa’s main steelmaking facilities and corporate offices are located in Monclova, Coahuila, close to transportation lines, raw materials supplies, principal points of export, and the company’s major domestic markets.

Primary resources 
Two steel plants operate in an area of nearly 3,000 acres. AHMSA extracts coal and iron ore. The company has its own coal mines in Palau, located 70 miles from Monclova. Once extracted, the washed coal is shipped by railroad to AHMSA’s coke plants.

The main source of iron ore is located in Hercules, Coahuila, a mine owned by AHMSA. From that point the iron ore is transported to AHMSA through a 180-mile pipe (called Ferroduct) that crosses the Coahuila desert. The Company also has iron ore mines in some other Mexican states.

Products 
AHMSA manufactures high value-added steel products. AHMSA is a national leader in the production and commercialization of flat steel products including hot rolled coil used for machinery parts, wide plate, cold rolled coil, tinplate and tin-free steel, railroad tanks and bridge constructions, structural shapes... It also produces non-flat steel products like heavy shapes.

AHMSA operates at an annual production rate of 3.5 million metric tons of liquid steel, with a workforce of 22,250 people, including its subsidiary companies.

Subsidiaries 
As of April 2014, its subsidiaries included:
 Cia. Real de Monte y Pachuca (RDM)
 Hojalata Mexicana SA. de CV. (HOMESA)
 Linea Coahuila-Durango SA de CV
 Minera del Norte
 Nacional de Acero SA. de CV. (NASA)
 Unidad Cerro del Mercado
 Unidad Hercules
 Unidad MICARE
 Unidad MIMOSA

Quality 
AHMSA received the following quality labels :
"Clean Industry" certifications issued by Mexico’s Environmental Protection Department
Environmental prize granted by the Mexican Chamber of Mining
Environmental Excellence Award granted by the Latin American Mining Organism

AHMSA also complies with the following standards :
The hot rolling department was approved by the audit of the quality system based on the European Standard EN 10025:2004
AHMSA was recertified for three more years by the ISO 14001 standard
Integrated systems were established for quality, health and environment in Cold Rolling 1, Structural Shapes and Maintenance and Services
MICARE, MIMOSA, CEMESA, Hércules and La Perla were approved by the ISO 9001:2000 standard, without observations

Since 1992, AHMSA leads an active social policy where its plants are active, maintaining permanent programs on the following fronts:
Installation and modernization of state-of-the-art steelworks and mining equipment that incorporates antipollution systems.
Operating and administrative practices in line with international environmental standards and certified by accredited external auditors.
Agreements with the Federal Environmental Protection Agency (PROFEPA) and with the National Water Commission (CNA), committing to the fulfillment of specific activities, established in the area of pollution control.
Voluntary adoption of best environmental practices developed at the international level by the industry and certified by the ISO14001 standard.
Integral rehabilitation of mined areas, with soil regeneration and repopulation of regional flora and fauna, as well as improvement of surroundings.
Integral support programs for communities where AHMSA companies operate in the Central, Carboniferous, Northern and Desert regions of the state of Coahuila, particularly through waste collection programs, operation of landfills, management and use of waste water, etc.
Creation of 5 management units for wild flora and fauna conservation, registered with permits as Animal Management Units (UMAs).
These policies and activities have positioned AHMSA and its companies as benchmarks in the field of Mexican steelworks and mining, establishing it as an example of high social responsibility

Ticker Symbols
AHMSA; IAM (ADR)

NAICs Codes
212111 Bituminous Coal and Lignite Surface Mining
212112 Bituminous Coal Underground Mining
21221 Iron Ore Mining
331111 Iron & Steel Mills
331221 Cold-Rolled Steel Shape Manufacturing
331222 Steel Wire Drawing.

References

External links
 Corporate Website

Manufacturing companies established in 1942
Mining companies of Mexico
Non-renewable resource companies established in 1942
Mexican companies established in 1942